Virgin Bhasskar 2 is a 2020 Hindi language  Indian comedy web series directed by Sangieta Rao. It is produced under Balaji Telefilms. The show streamed on ZEE5 on August 29, 2020.

Plot 
Bhasskar's life turns upside down after accepting Pakhi's deal of writing together. Heartbroken after several attempts at getting back to his love, Vidhi, he decides to leave everything behind-hitchhiking on highway, with no money or a destination and without the pressure of being in love. Bhasskar is finally set free.

Cast

Episodes

References

External links
 Virgin Bhasskar 2 on ALTBalaji
 
 Virgin Bhasskar 2 on ZEE5

Indian web series
Hindi-language web series